Shazrina binti Azman, also known as Mizz Nina, (born 1 July 1980) is a Malaysian fashion designer, motivational speaker, television personality, humanitarian, and co-founder of Dopstv, an Islamic lifestyle channel. She was also a musician, singer-songwriter, rapper, and dancer in the past.

She performed Hajj with her husband, Noh Salleh (of Malaysian indie band Hujan), and family in 2013, which changed her life. She began fully practicing Islam and wearing the hijab to express her love and devotion to the Deen.

Mizz Nina and her two partners founded the Islamic lifestyle channel DOPS (Deen of Peace Studios) TV Sdn Bhd in 2016 and have produced a number of successful TV series and talk shows. She has also committed to sharing and giving back by working with a variety of organizations that assist the underprivileged, including Cinta Syria Malaysia, 1moment4them, Possible Dreams International, Feeding The Needy, Miasa, and Into Taqwa Malaysia.

Life and music career 
She is the daughter of Azman Hashim, who is the Chairman of AmBank Group.

1999–2007: Teh Tarik Crew 

This group consist of several main members which is Santesh, Berg(UMP), Epi and Amar(FKP). In 1997, she formed First Born Troopz with Fiquetional, with whom she would later co-found the seminal Malaysian hip-hop group, the Teh Tarik Crew  in 1999. It was with TTC that her musical career truly took off, with two AIM nominations in 2002 for the group’s full-length album How’s The Level?. By 2004, Mizz Nina had two more AIM nominations, this time for Teh Tarik Crew’s sophomore album, What’s Next?. They later disbanded in 2007 to pursue solo careers.

2007–2013: Going solo 

In July 2010, she released her first solo album, What You Waiting For. She has collaborated with 3 international singers such as Theo Martins on the song "Let Me C U Get It", Colby O' Donis on "What You Waiting For" and  Grammy nominee Planet Asia on the song "Hope". Mizz Nina toured to Sri Lanka and India to promote her greatest hit "What You Waiting For".

In February 2012, she released a new single called "With You". A lyric video of the song was released onto YouTube, which had earned over 6,000 views on the debut week and reached 40 000 views within 3 weeks. Three months later, she released her second solo album called Takeover. On September of the same year, she released her latest single called "Summer Burning" which was produced by DJ Poet Name Life and written by Jamie Munson, Lucy McIntosh and Mizz Nina herself. Mizz Nina had also teamed up with the American rapper Flo Rida on a song called "Takeover". The music video, filmed in Miami, became a YouTube hit at the time earning 1,505,221 views on YouTube.

In February 2013, Mizz Nina released a single, Around The World featuring Korean-American superstar, Jay Park. The single was produced by Cha Cha Malone. On 26 March 2013, she released the music video for Around The World featuring Jay Park on her official YouTube channel, mizznina1780. The music video was filmed in December 2012 in Korea with Jay Park. The CD single for Around The World will be given free to customers who purchase anything at her Mizz Demeanor shop.

While touring in the US to promote her new single with Flo Rida titled Takeover in 2012, she was given the opportunity to host The MTV Iggy Show — Episode 12 live in Times Square, NYC to expose innocent bystanders to three fresh new artists (like herself) breaking out around the globe such as raw rock from Mexico’s Le Butcherettes, wavy hip-hop from American emcee Robert Raimon Roy, and the Swedish strains of First Aid Kit’s viral country. Mizz Nina recalls this as "an experience I will never forget".

Concerts and Live Performances 
Mizz Nina was invited to perform at many concert events such as MTV World Stage 2012, Watsons Music Festival 2012, Twin Towers Alive 2011 & 2013 & Bella Awards and Arthur's Day 2011. On December 1, 2011, she was one of the opening acts for Pitbull Live In Malaysia 2011. She also went to Melbourne in October 2012 to perform and launch her TakeOver album. On May 18, 2013, she held her first concert in Kuala Lumpur at the KL Live, Life Centre.

2011–2022: Marriage and subsequent retirement as singer 
Mizz Nina married Noh Salleh, vocalist for the indie rock band Hujan, with their wedding held at her family's former residence near Ukay Heights, Ampang on 1 July 2011, which was also her birthday. She performed Hajj with her husband in 2013. Her change into a more modest image after returning from her pilgrimage came as a surprise to reporters and netizens who were used to her as a sexy pop singer. It is also during this period that she had announced to retire her singing career to focus on her production and boutique aspirations, besides her newfound passion for her Muslim faith. Mizz Nina and Noh Salleh announced on their Instagram that they had separated in August 2022.

Mizz Nina is also known as a vocal coach since her retirement from Hollywood. She was once seen coaching students at the Singing Shop Studio, Amcorp Mall. Most of the students had been a blooming success after leaving the Singing Shop Studio, such as Alesya who is now known as a Producer and also a junior humanitarian and Syera who is now a well-known Cosplay model.

Fashion label
Mizz Nina is also a fashion designer for her own women's fashion label called Mizz Demeanor and Madeena Clothing. In 2014, Mizz Nina organized a World Hijab Day workshop with the latter company MaDeena on 1 February at Amcorp Mall, Petaling Jaya.

Production
Through her production company, Big Fish Entertainment, Mizz Nina is producing a 13-episode children program, The Cici & Caca Show. She also worked closely with young producer, Alesya.

Other appearances

As host

Discography

Studio albums
 What You Waiting For
 Takeover

Awards and nominations
Anugerah Industri Muzik
Anugerah Industri Muzik (or AIM) (literal English translation: Music Industry Awards), is an annual event similar to Grammy Awards which recognized Malaysia's finest artists. The year indicates the ceremony year, awarding the previous years' works.

Shout! Awards
The Shout! Awards is an entertainment award show created to celebrate the Malaysian entertainment scene which is said has rapidly developed. The award recognizes people of music, television, film and radio industry as well as the entertainment industry as a whole.

Anugerah Bintang Popular Berita Harian (Berita Harian's Most Popular Star Awards)
Anugerah Bintang Popular Berita Harian (or ABPBH) is an award ceremony that recognizes the most popular artistes of the year. The award is a yearly ceremony organized by one of Malaysia's newspapers, Berita Harian with results entirely based on votes cast by readers.

References 

1980 births
Living people
People from Kuala Lumpur
Malaysian women pop singers
Malaysian Muslims
Malaysian people of Malay descent
Malay-language singers
English-language singers from Malaysia
Malaysian rhythm and blues singers
Malaysian dance musicians
Malaysian hip hop singers
Women hip hop musicians
21st-century Malaysian women singers